Matucania is a genus of tachinid flies in the family Tachinidae.

Distribution
Matacania is found in Peru.

Species
Matucania mellisquama Townsend, 1919

References

Diptera of South America
Dexiinae
Tachinidae genera
Taxa named by Charles Henry Tyler Townsend